Diculești is a commune located in Vâlcea County, Oltenia, Romania. It is composed of four villages: Băbeni-Oltețu (the commune centre), Budești, Colelia and Diculești. These were part of Făurești Commune until 2004, when they were split off.

References

Communes in Vâlcea County
Localities in Oltenia